Yahoo! Mail is an email service offered by the American company Yahoo, Inc. The service is free for personal use, with an optional monthly fee for additional features. Business email was previously available with the Yahoo! Small Business brand, before it transitioned to Verizon Small Business Essentials in early 2022. Launched on October 8, 1997, as of January 2020, Yahoo! Mail has 225 million users.

Users are able to access and manage their mailboxes using webmail interface, accessible using a standard web browser. Some accounts also supported the use of standard mail protocols (POP3 and SMTP). Since 2015, users can also connect non-Yahoo e-mail accounts to the webmail client.

New Yahoo! Mail accounts, and most of the service's accounts, use yahoo.com as the email suffix. Previously, users could choose ymail.com or rocketmail.com as a suffix, or one of several country-specific suffixes. Many countries were available, such as yahoo.co.uk in the United Kingdom, yahoo.fr in France (also used by francophones) and yahoo.it in Italy. While these suffixes are discontinued for new accounts, they are preserved for existing accounts. Yahoo! Japan Mail, a separate service, offers both yahoo.co.jp and ymail.ne.jp as suffixes. Internet service providers using Yahoo! Mail offer their own suffixes for subscribers, with AT&T also offering free accounts to non-subscribers.

History

1997–2002

Yahoo! made a deal with the online communications company Four11 for co-branded white pages. Marvin Gavin, who worked at Four11 as the director of international business development, said "We always had a bias about being acquired by Yahoo. They were more entrepreneurial than Microsoft. We had a great cultural fit – it made a lot of sense." In the end, Yahoo! acquired Four11 for $96 million. The purpose behind acquiring Four11 was the company's RocketMail webmail service, which launched in 1997. Yahoo! announced the acquisition on October 8, 1997, close to the time that Yahoo! Mail was launched. Yahoo! chose acquisition rather than internal platform development, because, as Healy said, "Hotmail was growing at thousands and thousands users per week. We did an analysis. For us to build, it would have taken four to six months, and by then, so many users would have taken an email account. The speed of the market was critical."

The transition to Yahoo! Mail was not easy for many Rocketmail users. On March 21, 2002, Yahoo! eliminated free software client access and introduced the $29.99 per year Mail Forwarding Service. Mary Osako, a Yahoo! Spokeswoman, told CNET, "For-pay services on Yahoo!, originally launched in February 1999, have experienced great acceptance from our base of active registered users, and we expect this adoption to continue to grow."

2002–2010

During 2002, the Yahoo! network was gradually redesigned. On July 2, 2002, the company website was changed, and it was announced that Yahoo! Mail and other services would also be redesigned. Along with this new design, new features were to be implemented, including drop-down menus in DHTML, different category tabs, and a new user-customizable color scheme. Yahoo! Network Services senior vice president Geoff Ralston stated that

On July 9, 2004, Yahoo! acquired Oddpost, a webmail service which simulated a desktop email client. Oddpost had features such as drag-and-drop support, right-click menus, RSS feeds, a preview pane, and increased speed using email caching to shorten response time. Many of the features were incorporated into an updated Yahoo! Mail service.

Competition
On April 1, 2004, Google announced its Gmail service with 1 GB of storage, however Gmail's invitation-only accounts kept the other webmail services at the forefront. Most major webmail providers, including Yahoo! Mail, increased their mailbox storage in response. Yahoo! first announced 100 MB of storage for basic accounts and 2 GB of storage for premium users. However, soon Yahoo! Mail increased its free storage quota to 1 GB, before eventually allowing unlimited storage. Yahoo! Mail had free unlimited storage from March 27, 2007, until October 8, 2013.

2011–present

On September 17, 2010, Yahoo! showed off a new Mail program to reporters. Codenamed "Minty", the 2011 release was announced on September 16, 2010. It included a new interface, enhanced performance, improved Facebook and Twitter integration, the ability to watch YouTube videos straight from email, and improved search. Public beta began on October 26, 2010. In May 2011, the new Yahoo! Mail became the default interface. As the new interface became mandatory for users, some users of Yahoo! Mail reported slow typing speeds, contradicting Yahoo's claims of faster performance. Yahoo! offered no resolution to the problem . Users also missed the ability to paste textual email addresses into the sender box. The new version disabled the use of the "secondary" addresses provided in the previous version. The new interface overrode the browser's right mouse button (making functions such as opening mails in new tab windows unavailable).

In 2013, Yahoo! redesigned the site and removed several features, such as simultaneously opening multiple emails in tabs, sorting by sender name, and dragging mails to folders. The new email interface was geared to give an improved user-experience for mobile devices, but was criticized for having an inferior desktop interface. Many users objected to the unannounced nature of the changes through an online post asking Yahoo! to bring back mail tabs with one hundred thousand voting and nearly ten thousand commenting. The redesign produced a problem that caused an unknown number of users to lose access to their accounts for several weeks.

In December 2013, Yahoo! Mail suffered a major outage where approximately one million users, one percent of the site's total users, could not access their emails for several days. Then Yahoo! CEO Marissa Mayer publicly apologized to the site's users.

China Yahoo! Mail officially announced its shutdown on April 18, 2013. Users were warned that all emails, contacts, and account settings would be inaccessible, unless users migrated to the American version of Yahoo! Mail. Individuals who made China Yahoo! Mail accounts during the Alibaba takeover were required to create new accounts under new usernames.

In January 2014, an undisclosed number of usernames and passwords were released to hackers, following a security breach that Yahoo! believed had occurred through a third-party website. Yahoo! contacted affected users and requested that passwords be changed.

In October 2015, Yahoo! updated the mail service with a "more subtle" redesign, as well as improved mobile features. The same release introduced the Yahoo! Account Key, a smartphone-based replacement for password logins.

In 2017, Yahoo! again redesigned the web interface with a "more minimal" look, and introduced the option to customize it with different color themes and layouts.

In 2020, Yahoo! added a feature to view NFL matches.

User interface 
As many as three web interfaces were available at any given time. The traditional "Yahoo! Mail Classic" preserved the availability of their original 1997 interface until July 2013 in North America. A 2005 version included a new Ajax interface, drag-and-drop, improved search, keyboard shortcuts, address auto-completion, and tabs. However, other features were removed, such as column widths and one click delete-move-to-next. In October 2010, Yahoo! released a beta version of Yahoo! Mail, which included improvements to performance, search, and Facebook integration. In May 2011, this became the default interface. Their current Webmail interface was introduced in 2017.

Spam policy

Yahoo! Mail is often used by spammers to provide a "remove me" email address. Often, these addresses are used to verify the recipient's address, thus opening the door for more spam.

Yahoo! does not tolerate this practice and terminates accounts connected with spam-related activities without warning, causing spammers to lose access to any other Yahoo! services connected with their ID under the Terms of Service. Additionally, Yahoo! stresses that its servers are based in California and any spam-related activity which uses its servers could potentially violate that state's anti-spam laws.

In February 2006, Yahoo! announced its decision (along with AOL) to give some organizations the option to "certify" mail by paying up to one cent for each outgoing message, allowing the mail in question to bypass inbound spam filters.

Filters
In order to prevent abuse, in 2002 Yahoo! Mail activated filters which changed certain words (that could trigger unwanted JavaScript events) and word fragments into other words. "mocha" was changed to "espresso", "expression" became "statement", and "eval" (short for "evaluation") became "review". This resulted in many unintended corrections, such as "prevent" (prevalent), "revalidation" (evaluation) and "media review" (medieval).

When asked about these changes, Yahoo! explained that the changed words were common terms used in there privacy dashboard and were blacklisted to prevent hackers from sending damaging commands via the program's HTML function. Starting before February 7, 2006, Yahoo! Mail ended the practice, and began to add an underscore as a prefix to certain suspicious words and word fragments.

Greylisting

Incoming mail to Yahoo! addresses can be subjected to deferred delivery as part of Yahoo's incoming spam controls. This can delay delivery of mail sent to Yahoo! addresses without the sender or recipients being aware of it. The deferral is typically of short duration, but may extend up to several hours. Yahoo! does not specifically document this policy in detail, although some information is available.

Controversies

Shi Tao arrest
In 2004, Yahoo's Hong Kong office provided technical information to the Chinese authorities about the account of journalist Shi Tao, who was subsequently sentenced to ten years' imprisonment for "leaking state secrets". Yahoo! was criticized by Reporters Without Borders for acting as a "police informant" to increase its profits. In August 2007, the United States Congress began an investigation into Yahoo's handling of the case. Yahoo! founder Jerry Yang testified before Congress. On November 6, 2007, the congressional panel criticized Yahoo! for not giving full details to the House Foreign Affairs Committee the previous year, stating it had been "at best inexcusably negligent" and at worst "deceptive". Representative Tom Lantos described its executives as moral "pygmies". Yang stated that Yahoo! no longer controlled its Chinese operations, and was collaborating with human rights groups to formulate ethical code for technology companies.

In a February 2006 hearing, Yahoo! executives swore that they had received no information about the investigation. Several months later, it was discovered that the document provided to Yahoo! China on April 22, 2004, by the Beijing State Security Bureau stated that "Your office is in possession of the following items relating to a case of suspected illegal provision of state secrets to foreign entities."

On November 13, 2007, Yahoo! settled with Shi for an undisclosed sum. Shi was released from prison in September 2013.

Username bans
On February 20, 2006, it was revealed that Yahoo! Mail was banning the word "Allah" in email usernames, both separately and as part of a user name such as linda.callahan. Shortly after the news of the ban, it was lifted on February 23, 2006. Along with this action, Yahoo! also made the following statement:

Exploit
In November 2012, an exploit for Yahoo! Mail was sold for $700 by an Egyptian hacker, allowing hijackers to hack Yahoo! Mail user accounts and redirect users to a malicious website. The attack used cross-site scripting which let hackers steal cookies. In January 2013, hacker and security researcher Shahin Ramezany pointed out another DOM-based XSS loophole that placed 400 million users at risk.

Deletion of accounts
In 2013, Yahoo! deleted accounts that hadn't been logged into for more than 12 months and gave those names to other users. This included accounts that had set up email forwarding to other accounts, who didn't notice and act upon the message to preserve their account. Spillover from this action resulted in some users losing access to accounts on other services as their email resets were no longer forwarded to them, but to the new owner of their former account.

Phishing attack
From 2007, Yahoo! was the email service used by New Zealand Telecom, which came under criticism in early 2013 following a spam and phishing attack that was described as the biggest to have ever hit the country. Telecom and Yahoo! automatically reset "about 60,000" users' passwords. In April, Telecom announced that despite the issue, it would retain Yahoo! as an email provider.

Account theft
On October 3, 2017, Yahoo! reported that all Yahoo! user accounts, approximately 3 billion, were affected by the previously announced August 2013 theft of accounts. This information updates the December 14, 2016, announcement that more than 1 billion user accounts were hacked in a breach that had occurred back in 2013. Earlier that year in September, Yahoo! announced that an additional 500 million user accounts had been breached in 2014. The company was said to have discovered about the breach that affected hundreds of millions of accounts years before their initial announcement.

Automated scanning of email content
The contents of Yahoo! Mail messages are scanned for the purposes of targeted advertising, in contrast to its main competitors Gmail (which ended the practice in late 2017) and Outlook.com (which did not employ the practice).

Content sharing with the National Security Agency 
In 2015, Reuters reported that Yahoo! has implemented a functionality to scan all incoming emails for specific keywords and share email content in real time with the US National Security Agency.

Platforms
The mobile app for Yahoo! Mail can be downloaded from the App Store for iOS, and the Google Play Store for Android. Both versions of the app perform the same function, but are tailored to the mobile device's operating system. Some characteristics include replying to a message by opening a notification and separately archiving, deleting and starring notifications. It is available in several languages.

See also
 Comparison of webmail providers
 List of Yahoo!-owned sites and services

References

External links
 

 
Mail
Android (operating system) software
Computer-related introductions in 1997
Internet properties established in 1997
IOS software
Personal information managers
Universal Windows Platform apps
Webmail
Web applications
Yahoo! community websites